Lepoderma may refer to:
 Lepoderma, a genus of molluscs in the family Chaetodermatidae, synonym of Falcidens
 Lepoderma, a genus of flatworms in the family Plagiorchiidae, synonym of Plagiorchis